Ampera Station is a station of the Palembang LRT Line 1, located in Ilir Timur I, Palembang.

The station is close to the Ampera Bridge and Kuto Besak Fortress. The station became one of six stations that opened at the Palembang LRT launch on 1 August 2018.

Station layout

References

Palembang
Railway stations in South Sumatra
Railway stations opened in 2018